Jaroslav Spišiak (born 4 November 1963) is a Slovak former police force President and Vice President throughout most of the 2000s.

Spišiak attended the Academy of the Police College in Bratislava and graduated in 1995. He also attended university at Akadémia Policajného zboru v Bratislave in Rača.

He was appointed as the first Vice President of the Slovak Police Force by Interior Minister Ivan Shimko in 2001. He served in that position for a majority of the 2000s until he was named the President of the Force in 2010.

He only remained in office for two years before he was replaced by Tibor Gašpar in 2012.

References

External links
 Jaroslav Spišiak at bystriconviny.sk
 Jaroslav Spišiak at Aktuality.sk

1963 births
Living people
People from Levice District
Slovak police officers